José do Telhado is a 1929 Portuguese silent historical film directed by Rino Lupo. It portrays the life of the nineteenth century bandit José do Telhado.

Cast
 Carlos Azedo as José 'Zé' do Telhado 
 Rafael Alves 
 Aida Cruz
 Luis Capinha 
 Alberto Cardoso 
 Maria Emília Castelo Branco as Maria Genoveva  
 Zita de Oliveira as Ermelinda 
 Ainda Lupo as Fidalguinha da Mo 
 Luís Magalhães as José Pequeno  
 Julieta Palmeiro as Aninhas  
 João Celestino Pedroso 
 Laura Vidal as Tia Isabel

References

Bibliography
 João Fatela. O sangue e a rua: elementos para uma antropologia da violência em Portugal (1926-1946). Publicações Dom Quixote, 1989.

External links 

1929 films
1920s historical adventure films
Portuguese historical adventure films
Portuguese silent films
1920s Portuguese-language films
Films directed by Rino Lupo
Films set in the 19th century
Portuguese black-and-white films
Silent historical adventure films